Josip Mišić (born 28 June 1994) is a Croatian professional footballer who plays as a midfielder for Dinamo Zagreb.

Club career
Rising through the ranks of the NK Osijek academy, Mišić made his senior team debut in the UEFA Europa League qualifiers 3–1 home win against FC Santa Coloma, coming in for Zoran Kvržić. Not long afterwards, he made his Prva HNL debut as well, coming in the 14th minute of the 3–0 away win against NK Inter Zaprešić for the injured Domagoj Pušić, scoring his first senior goal on the same match, in the 82nd minute.

In December 2014, despite rumours linking him with Dinamo Zagreb, he signed a -year contract with HNK Rijeka. Following three successful years with Rijeka, in January 2018 Mišić moved to Sporting CP on a -year deal, with the transfer valued at €3 million.

On 15 May 2018, Mišić and several of his teammates, including coaches, were injured following an attack by around 50 supporters of Sporting at the club's training ground after the team finished third in the league and missed out on the UEFA Champions League qualification. Despite the attack, he and the rest of the team agreed to play in the Portuguese Cup final scheduled for the following weekend, eventually losing to C.D. Aves.

On 17 January 2019, PAOK announced the signing of Mišić on loan from Sporting Lisbon until June 2020 with a buy-out option. On 22 March 2020, after a remarkable season (the Croatian midfielder has provided an impressive total of eight assists, also scoring five goals including a last-gasp equaliser against arch-rivals Aris)and despite reports on the contrary in Portugal's press, it is clear that PAOK's agreement with Josip Misic will took place in the next months and the Croatian will sign a yearly contract with the Greek club. PAOK decided to trigger his optional buy-out clause of €2 million.

International career
He made his debut for Croatia in a January 2017 China Cup match against Chile and his second and final international was three days later in the same tournament against the host nation.

On 31 October 2022, Mišić was named in the preliminary 34-man squad for the 2022 FIFA World Cup, but did not make the final 26.

Career statistics

Honours
HNK Rijeka
Prva HNL: 2016–17
Croatian Cup: 2016–17

Sporting CP
Taça de Portugal: 2018–19

PAOK
Super League Greece: 2018–19
Greek Cup: 2018–19

Dinamo Zagreb
Prva HNL: 2020–21
Croatian Cup: 2020–21

Individual
Croatian First Football League: Top assists provider: 2013–14
Croatian First Football League Team of the Year: 2016–17
PAOK MVP of the Season: 2019–20
Super League Greece Team of the Year: 2019–20

References

External links
 

1994 births
Living people
Sportspeople from Vinkovci
Association football midfielders
Croatian footballers
Croatia youth international footballers
Croatia under-21 international footballers
Croatia international footballers
NK Osijek players
HNK Rijeka players
Spezia Calcio players
Sporting CP footballers
PAOK FC players
GNK Dinamo Zagreb players
Croatian Football League players
Serie B players
Primeira Liga players
Super League Greece players
Croatian expatriate footballers
Expatriate footballers in Italy
Croatian expatriate sportspeople in Italy
Expatriate footballers in Portugal
Croatian expatriate sportspeople in Portugal
Expatriate footballers in Greece
Croatian expatriate sportspeople in Greece